The Rip-Off AKA The Squeeze and Diamond Thieves is a 1980 film directed by Antonio Margheriti. It was Margheriti's third collaboration with actor Lee Van Cleef, after previously directing him in The Stranger and the Gunfighter and Take a Hard Ride.

Synopsis
Retired safe-cracker Chris Gretchko is coaxed out of comfortable retirement by Jeff Olafson, the impulsive son of a former accomplice, who begs him to help steal an undocumented shipment of diamonds to satiate Van Stratten, a New York City crime boss whose mistress, Jessica, has been seeing Jeff on the side. Chris subsequently recruits his old friend, pawn shop owner Sam, who agrees to fence the diamonds afterward. When they learn Van Stratten intends to cut them out of the deal, Chris and Jeff plot a countermeasure, resulting in Jeff getting thrown in jail to give him plausible deniability, and Chris convalescing in a safe house after getting shot during the heist. Clarisse, an eccentric neighbor in the building, discovers Chris, and agrees to help tend his injuries and lie to police who come looking for him. However, Captain Donati begins to piece together the events, and all the involved parties find their lives in danger.

Cast 
 Lee Van Cleef as Chris
 Karen Black as Clarisse
 Edward Albert as Jeff
 Robert Alda as Captain Donati
 Lionel Stander as Sam 
 Angelo Infanti as Inspector 
 Antonella Murgia as Jessica 
 Peter Carsten as Van Stratten
 Ron van Clief as Duke
 Roy Brocksmith as Warehouse owner

Production
The Rip-Off was filmed in Hamburg and on location in New York City from December 1977 to February 1978.

Release
The Rip-Off was released in Italy on 1 April 1980. The film has been released in the United States under the titles The Rip-Off and The Squeeze.

Notes

References

External links
 
 

1980 films
1980s crime action films
Italian crime action films
West German films
Films directed by Antonio Margheriti
Films shot in Hamburg
Films set in New York City
Films set in the United States
Italian gangster films
Italian heist films
1980s heist films
English-language German films
English-language Italian films
1970s Italian films
1980s Italian films